A Children's Story, also known as Certain Children in Australia, was directed by Andrea and Antonio Frazzi in 2004 and is an italian drama film which focuses on the life of an eleven-year-old boy growing up in an environment of poverty and criminality in Naples. This was the second film to be made by the Frazzi twins, Il cielo cade (starring Isabella Rossellini and JeroenKrabbé) having been released in 2000. It was Andrea Frazzi's last film; he died in May 2006.

Certi bambini was awarded the 2004 Crystal Globe at the 39th Karlovy Vary International Film Festival.

Cast 

 Gianluca Di Gennaro	as	Rosario
 Carmine Recano	as	Damiano
 Arturo Paglia	as	Santino
 Sergio Solli	as	Casaluce
 Rolando Ravello	as	Sciancalepore
 Marcello Romolo	as	Don Alfonso
 Mario Giordano
 Nuccia Fumo
 Terence Guida
 Miriam Candurro	as Catarina
 Carlo Caracciolo
 Francesco Di Leva
 Marcella Granito	as Giulia
 Alessandro Guasco
 Gennaro Mirto
 Patrizio Rispo
 Maria Laura Rondanini

Awards 

 Karlovy Vary International Film Festival: Best Film

See also 
 List of Italian films of 2004

References

External links

A Children's Story at Eurochannel

2004 films
2004 drama films
Italian drama films
2000s Italian-language films
Films about the Camorra
Films set in Naples
Crystal Globe winners
Films directed by the Frazzi brothers
2000s Italian films